Orocrambus machaeristes is a moth in the family Crambidae. It was described by Edward Meyrick in 1905. It is endemic to New Zealand, where it has been recorded from north-western Nelson, south along the Southern Alps to Lake Wakatipu. This species prefers alpine habitat.

The wingspan is 19–25 mm. The forewings grey, sprinkled with white and dark brown. The hindwings are greyish white.

References

Crambinae
Moths described in 1905
Moths of New Zealand
Endemic fauna of New Zealand
Taxa named by Edward Meyrick
Endemic moths of New Zealand